Hallo aus Berlin (English: Hello from Berlin) is a British educational television series co-produced by the BBC and the Goethe-Institut. It is produced in a 'magazine' style with reports, interviews, music, and animated sequences, aimed at beginner German speakers from ages 11–14.

The series' 10 episodes aired in the BBC Schools strand from 19 September 1996. It has been used as a German teaching aid in the United Kingdom, the United States, Canada, France, Monaco, Italy, San Marino, the Czech Republic, Denmark, Norway, Sweden, Finland, Iceland, Hungary, Poland, the Netherlands, Slovakia, Romania, Ukraine, Greece, Cyprus, Israel, Saudi Arabia, India, and Australia.

The main characters are Marko Walther, Jessica König, Daniel Augustin, Esther Walk, Thomas Lindel and Miriam Casten, a group of young people who introduce the audience to everyday life in Berlin. An animated sketch and song performed by the host characters, Rolli Schmidt and Rita Weiß, appears in every episode, with the sketch not appearing in the tenth and last episode, "Unser Berlin".

Episodes

Rolli and Rita 
Rolli Schmidt (15) and Rita Weiß (14) are teenagers who appear in every episode of the series, performing a sketch and a song. Rolli also appears in the opening titles of the show.

They were described as 'state of the art' at the time of the series' original airing in 1996. Independent producers Baxter Hobbins Slides developed a 3D motion-capture system, which was used to animate the characters. This consisted of motion sensor equipped suits, allowing the movements of actors to be mapped to the 3D models. A real-time wireframe animated model of the characters could then be produced, after which skin and clothes were added. The lip movements of the characters were achieved by utilising the real lip movements of actors filmed against a blue screen.

The sketches were later redubbed in French and Spanish for Quinze Minutes Plus (Juju et Juliette) and Revista (Julio y Julia).

Rolli was voiced by Fredrick Ruth (credited as Frido Ruth), and Rita was voiced by Nina Hamm, while her singing voice was done by Christina Fry, a professional actress, singer, comedian and writer.

External links 

 Hallo aus Berlin on YouTube with English subtitles: https://youtube.com/playlist?list=PL9qxmHLFngp0xvf4lzT-4-iqfSHq6nzwJ
 Hallo aus Berlin – Clips on BBC.com
 Christina Fry Official Website - Rita's Singing Voice

References 

German-language education television programming
British television shows for schools
Language education in the United Kingdom